Beaver Lake Seaplane Base  is a state owned, public use seaplane base located four nautical miles (5 mi, 7 km) northeast of Big Lake, in the Matanuska-Susitna Borough of the U.S. state of Alaska.

Facilities and aircraft 
Beaver Lake Seaplane Base resides at elevation of 150 feet (46 m) above mean sea level. It has one seaplane landing area designated 1W/19W with a water surface measuring 5,000 by 400 feet (1,524 x 122 m).

For the 12-month period ending May 31, 2009, the airport had 430 aircraft operations, an average of 35 per month: 93% general aviation and 7% air taxi. At that time there were 6 aircraft based at this airport, all engine.

References

External links 
 Topographic map from USGS The National Map

Airports in Matanuska-Susitna Borough, Alaska
Seaplane bases in Alaska